Meyer House may refer to:

in the United States
(by state then city)
 Pearl and Bess Meyer House, Flora, Illinois, listed on the National Register of Historic Places (NRHP) in Clay County
 Dr. John and Gerda Meyer House, Beverly Shores, Indiana, listed on the NRHP in Porter County
 Meyer's Castle, Dyer, Indiana, listed on the NRHP as Joseph Ernest Meyer House
 Meyer House (Florissant, Missouri), listed on the NRHP in St. Louis County
 August Meyer House, Kansas City, Missouri, listed on the NRHP in Jackson County
 Sutter-Meyer House, University City, Missouri, listed on the NRHP in St. Louis County
 John Meyer House, Washington, Missouri, listed on the NRHP in Franklin County
 Meyer House (Portsmouth, Ohio), listed on the NRHP in Scioto County
 Frederick A.E. Meyer House, Salt Lake City, Utah, listed on the NRHP in Salt Lake County
 Meyer House (Olympia, Washington), listed on the NRHP in Thurston County
 White-Meyer House, Washington, D.C., listed on the National Register of Historic Places (NRHP) in Washington, D.C.
 Starke Meyer House, Fox Point, Wisconsin, listed on the NRHP in Milwaukee County
 Henry A. Meyer House, Shorewood, Wisconsin, listed on the NRHP in Milwaukee County

See also
Meyers House (disambiguation)
Mayer House (disambiguation)
Myer House (disambiguation)
Myers House (disambiguation)